The Azad Pakistan Party was a leftist Pakistani party founded in November 1949 by Mian Iftikharuddin, an ex-Congressite and a member of the Muslim League who worked for the Pakistan Movement.
It was formed in 1949, becoming Pakistan's first opposition party. It, however, failed to make an impact and was later merged with the National Awami Party.

References

1949 establishments in Pakistan
Defunct political parties in Pakistan
Political parties established in 1949
Muslim League breakaway groups